Karol Wacław Świerczewski (callsign Walter; 10 February 1897 – 28 March 1947) was a Polish and Soviet Red Army general and statesman. He was a Bolshevik Party member during the Russian Civil War and a Soviet officer in the wars fought abroad by the Soviet Union including the one against Polish as well as Ukrainian Republics and in Republican Spain. In 1939 he participated in the Soviet invasion of Poland again. At the end of World War II in Europe he was installed as one of leaders of the Soviet-sponsored Polish Provisional Government of National Unity. Soon later, Świerczewski died in a country-road ambush shot by the militants from OUN-UPA. He was an icon of communist propaganda for the following several decades.

Life
Born in Warsaw in Congress Poland, Karol Świerczewski grew up in a poor working-class family and began working at age 12 in a local Warsaw factory. During the First World War, at the age of 18 he was evacuated in 1915 to Moscow by the Russian Imperial Army. According to his official biography in the Polish People's Republic he was a member of the Social Democracy of the Kingdom of Poland and Lithuania.

In 1918 he joined the Bolshevik Party, and fought in the Russian Civil War as a soldier of the Red Army. In 1919 during the Polish-Soviet War he fought on the Soviet side against the Polish Second Republic and was wounded. He remained in Russia and in 1928 on the occasion of the 10th anniversary of establishment of the Red Army he was awarded the Order of the Red Banner (no. 146), his first military award. From 1921, Świerczewski taught in the Soviet School for the Red Commissars. In 1927 he graduated from Frunze Military Academy in Moscow and worked in the Red Army General Staff.

Spanish Civil War
In 1936, under the name General Walter, he was sent to Spain during the Spanish Civil War, where he initially led the XIV International Brigade in the Battle of Lopera, and later the 35th International Division in the Segovia offensive, and the battles of Brunete, Belchite, Teruel, the Aragon Offensive  and the Battle of the Ebro. By April 1938 Spanish communist leaders wanted the replacement of many International Brigade commanders due to poor performance, and although André Marty disagreed, he had to compromise and General Walter and Vladimir Ćopić were replaced.

General in the Red Army
Following the outbreak of the Second World War and the Soviet invasion of Poland, Świerczewski served as general in the Soviet Army. His Russian commanders, seeing Świerczewski's apparent incompetence and worsening alcoholism, moved him to a reserve command away from the front lines—the decision was made by General Georgi Zhukov himself. The fact that Świerczewski gave most of his orders under influence of alcohol had tragic consequences for his soldiers, described in General Zygmunt Berling's book Wspomnienia (Memories).

 
In 1943 he became one of the generals charged with the creation of the Soviet-controlled Polish Armed Forces in the East, the 1st Polish Army. His alcoholism and disregard for the life and health of his soldiers stirred conflict with Zygmunt Berling, and led to his removal from command on several occasions. Świerczewski's alcoholism-related orders gained criticism from other Polish generals as well, including General Aleksander Waszkiewicz.

In 1944 he became one of the leaders of the Polish Workers' Party and the government of People's Republic of Poland. In the winter of 1944 and the spring of 1945 he led the Polish Second Army during the fighting for western Poland and the Battle of Berlin. His leadership in the Battle of Bautzen (Budziszyn) has been severely criticized by modern historians, and he is held responsible for the Second Army's very heavy casualties in that engagement. While commanding, he might have been drunk, and was temporarily relieved of his command. However, due to important backing in the Soviet political apparatus (Main Intelligence Directorate or NKVD), not only did he retain his command, but his mistakes were hushed up, and after the war he was glorified as a hero.

In February 1946 Świerczewski became the Deputy Defense Minister of Poland. He was involved in the persecution of the anti-communist underground movement in Poland, and signed many death sentences, while establishing the communist regime.

Controversial death

Świerczewski was heavily wounded in a skirmish near Baligród in March 1947 while driving in a car without escort for the inspection of Polish troops fighting Ukrainian insurgents. He was ambushed by a unit of Ukrainian Insurgent Army, and died from his wounds within hours. There were several conspiracy theories claiming that the ambush was arranged by the Soviet intelligence due to his insubordination. According to one theory, the information about the general's arrival to the area was passed to Ukrainians by the NKVD and his escort prevented from leaving by mechanical problems with both trucks that transported the escort's soldiers. Most other hypotheses also suggest Soviet or even direct orders from Stalin. The general, a Pole by ethnicity but essentially a Soviet officer with a military record from the Spanish Civil War and a long Red Army war record, had been previously placed lower in the command structure than prewar Polish officers Berling and Rola-Żymierski.

For several years after the Second World War ended, the Ukrainian Nationalist insurgency, led mainly by the Ukrainian Insurgent Army, continued fighting in the South-East of Poland. This war, largely supported by the local Ukrainian part of the population, continued until 1949, with some sporadic fights taking place as late as 1956. Świerczewski's death was used as direct cause for the forcible expulsion of the Ukrainian civilian population in Operation Vistula from the territories in the South Eastern part of the post-war Poland to the Recovered Territories (Ziemie Odzyskane, areas of western Poland, which before the war had been part of Germany). In the socialist Poland many myths were created around Karol Świerczewski ("The General of Three Armies"), but details of his life and especially his service in the Red Army during Polish-Soviet War as well as the details of his Spanish War record were never mentioned.

Awards
:
 Order of the Builders of People's Poland (posthumous) 
 Virtuti Militari (Grand Cross) (posthumous)
 Virtuti Militari (Commander)
 Order of the Cross of Grunwald (1st class)
 Gold Cross of Merit
 Medal of Victory and Freedom 1945 
 Silesian Uprising Cross
 Medal "For Oder, Neisse and the Baltic"
 Medal "For Warsaw 1939-1945"
 Medal "For Your and Our Freedom" (posthumous)
:
 2 Orders of Lenin (1937, 1945)
 Order of the Red Banner, three times (1928, 1938, 1944)
 Order of Suvorov, 1st class (1945)
 Medal "For the Liberation of Warsaw" (1945)
 Medal "For the Capture of Berlin" (1945)
 Medal "For the Victory over Germany in the Great Patriotic War 1941–1945" (1945)
 Jubilee Medal "XX Years of the Workers' and Peasants' Red Army" (1938)
Other countries:
 Order of the White Lion, 2nd class (Czechoslovakia)
 Silver Medal of the Czechoslovak Military Order for Liberty  (Czechoslovakia)
 Laureate Plate of Madrid (Spanish Republic)
 Order of the Liberation of Spain (Spanish Republic)
 Order of Bravery (Yugoslavia)
  Order of the Partisan Star, 1st class (Yugoslavia)

Legacy

In People's Republic of Poland, the Polish communist propaganda made him into a hero, and many controversial aspects of his life such as alcohol abuse and his incompetence during the Battle of Bautzen, as well as postwar Stalinist crimes were hushed up. In 1953, a Polish two-part film depicting the life of Świerczewski, Żołnierz zwycięstwa (A Soldier of Victory), was released. Józef Wyszomirski portrayed the General.

In the years 1945-1991 the present Miguel de Cervantes Liceum in Warsaw was named after him.

During the years 1975–1996 Karol Świerczewski's picture was on the popular 50 złoty banknote, initially the equivalent of two bottles of cheap Vodka. 
After 1989 with the end of the Warsaw Pact and the coming to power of Solidarity, many of his monuments were removed and streets renamed because of his role in implementing the communist regime in Poland.

On May 21, 2003, the Polish organization of former veterans and independence fighters applied to the Institute of National Remembrance (IPN) to investigate 'crimes against the Polish nation' committed by Karol Świerczewski. In a letter, they recall that he was "one of the people who consciously worked towards [the] enslavement of Polish nation, through enforced communist regime that was [a] vassal towards Moscow". Among crimes that are not subject to expiry and should be investigated by the IPN are 29 death sentences on Polish soldiers and officers, which were signed by Świerczewski during his command of the Soviet-controlled 2nd Polish Army.

Photography
While generally unwilling to let himself be photographed, General Walter was a keen amateur photographer. His daughter donated 333 of his photographs to the Asociación de Amigos de las Brigadas Internacionales in Albacete, Spain, to form a permanent part of their archive.

Notes

References
 
 Neugass, James War is Beautiful. An American Ambulance Driver in the Spanish Civil War, The New Press, London-New York, 2008
 I. Pidkova, R. M. Shust, K. Bondarenko, "Dovidnyk z istoriï Ukraïny " (A hand-book on the History of Ukraine), 3-Volumes, Article "Сверчевський Кароль " (t. 3), Kiev, 1993–1999,  (t. 1),  (t. 2),  (t. 3).
  Пан Вальтер (Mister Walter) in "Совершенно секретно" monthly, Russia.

1897 births
1947 deaths
Military personnel from Warsaw
People from Warsaw Governorate
Social Democracy of the Kingdom of Poland and Lithuania politicians
Bolsheviks
Polish Workers' Party politicians
Members of the State National Council
Members of the Polish Sejm 1947–1952
Polish anti-fascists
Polish People's Army generals
Polish military personnel of World War II
Polish people of the Spanish Civil War
Soviet officers in Polish Army 1943-1968
Recipients of the Order of the Builders of People's Poland
Recipients of the Virtuti Militari (1943–1989)
Soviet colonel generals
Spanish generals
Soviet military personnel of World War II
Soviet people of Polish descent
Soviet people of the Spanish Civil War
Frunze Military Academy alumni
Soviet military personnel of the Russian Civil War
People of the Polish–Soviet War
Recipients of the Order of Lenin
Recipients of the Order of the Red Banner
Recipients of the Order of Suvorov, 1st class
Ukrainian Insurgent Army
Deaths by firearm in Poland
Burials at Powązki Military Cemetery
Victims of the Organization of Ukrainian Nationalists
Polish generals in other armies